Lawrence H. Lebduska (1894-1966) was an American artist who became known as a housepainter. Born in Baltimore, Maryland on September 1, 1894, his parents moved to Leipzig, Germany when he was 5. While in Germany, he studied stained glass under Josef Svoboda.  Lebduska returned to the United States in 1912, first settling in Baltimore and later moving to New York.

Professional life
Lebduska was commissioned by interior designer Elsie de Wolfe to paint murals. He contributed to many group shows and had his first one-man show in 1936, which is said to have inspired Abby Aldrich Rockefeller to begin her folk art collection.  Lebduska did a number of projects for the WPA, but his work was relatively underappreciated until a gallery show six years before his death. Despite that, his works were frequently exhibited at a number of galleries, the Museum of Modern Art,

He has pieces in the permanent collection of a number of museums including the Smithsonian American Art Museum, MoMA, and the Wadsworth Athenaeum.

References

1894 births
1966 deaths
Federal Art Project artists
American expatriates in Germany
People from Baltimore
Date of death missing
Place of death missing